Marcus Hook Range Rear Light is a lighthouse near Bellefonte, Delaware marking a range on the Delaware River. It is the highest light on the Atlantic coast of the United States. The lighthouse is visible on the horizon from the windows of high-rise buildings in downtown Wilmington, Delaware.

History
The permanent structure was preceded by a temporary light on a post, erected in 1915. The present tower was built in 1918 and was composed of nine sections of reinforced concrete; there is also an oil house and a keeper's dwelling on the site. The original beacon displayed a fixed white light using a Fourth order Fresnel lens; this was removed in the early 1980s and replaced with a RL-24 beacon, displaying a fixed red indication. The light was automated in the 1950s, but the keeper's house was occupied by Coast Guard personnel until 2004.

In March 2005 the lighthouse became available for transfer under the National Historic Lighthouse Preservation Act, but in 2010 a private owner bought the lighthouse and the accompanying home on the property. The tower is an active aid to navigation and not open to the public. The light was turned off a few years ago.

Front Light
The present tower was erected in 1925 and was preceded by a temporary light tower erected in 1915. It has always been automated.

References

Lighthouses completed in 1918
Lighthouses on the National Register of Historic Places in Delaware
Lighthouses in New Castle County, Delaware
National Register of Historic Places in New Castle County, Delaware